Christopher Alan Leigh Mottershead (born 24 September 1958) is a British (Welsh) travel industry entrepreneur, and the UK Managing Director of Thomas Cook.

Early life
He attended Cowbridge Grammar School (Cowbridge Comprehensive School from 1974) in Cowbridge, Wales, then studied History at the University of Warwick.

Career
He started as a graduate at Wales Gas.

TUI
From 2001 to 2004 he was the Managing Director of TUI UK, in Sussex. The group had over 900 retail shops, and 10,000 staff.

Thomas Cook
He joined Thomas Cook in April 2015. He became UK Managing Director of Thomas Cook Group on 1 October 2015.

Travel Leaders Group
In October 2019, Mottershead joined the Travel Leaders Group, partent company of Barrhead Travel. Mottershead was hired to coordinate the expansion efforts of the organisation to deliverer on growth and develop Barrhead branches across new locations.

Personal life
Married to Vivienne Piper in July 1992 and together they have 4 children; Olivia, Lily, Holly and Joseph.

References

External links
 Thomas Cook

1958 births
Alumni of the University of Warwick
British company founders
British hospitality businesspeople
People educated at Cowbridge Grammar School
People from Cowbridge
TUI Group
Welsh chief executives
Living people